In  algebraic topology, the Massey product is a cohomology operation of higher order introduced in , which generalizes the cup product. The Massey product was created by William S. Massey, an American algebraic topologist.

Massey triple product
Let  be elements of the cohomology algebra  of a differential graded algebra .

This may result in a well-defined cohomology class, or may result in indeterminacy.

Define  to be . The Massey triple product of three cohomology classes is  defined by

If  have degrees , then the Massey product has degree , with the  coming from the differential .

So the Massey product can be regarded as a function defined on triples of classes such that the product of the first or last two is zero, taking values in the above quotient group.

The bounding chains  and  have indeterminacy, which disappears when one moves to homology, and since  and  have the same boundary, subtracting them (the sign convention is to correctly handle the grading) gives a cocycle (the boundary of the difference vanishes), and one thus obtains a well-defined element of cohomology — this step is analogous to defining the st homotopy or homology group in terms of indeterminacy in null-homotopies/null-homologies of n-dimensional maps/chains.

Geometrically, in singular cohomology of a manifold, one can interpret the product dually in terms of bounding manifolds and intersections, following Poincaré duality: dual to cocycles are cycles, often representable as closed manifolds (without boundary), dual to product is intersection, and dual to the subtraction of the bounding products is gluing the two bounding manifolds together along the boundary, obtaining a closed manifold which represents the homology class dual of the Massey product. In reality homology classes of manifolds cannot always be represented by manifolds – a representing cycle may have singularities – but with this caveat the dual picture is correct.

Higher order Massey products

for all solutions of the equations
, 

The higher order Massey product  can be thought of as the obstruction to solving the latter system of equations for all , in the sense that it contains the 0 cohomology class if and only if these equations are solvable.  This n-fold Massey product is an  order cohomology operation, meaning that for it to be nonempty many lower order Massey operations have to contain 0, and moreover the cohomology classes it represents all differ by terms involving lower order operations. The 2-fold Massey product is just the usual cup product and is a first order cohomology operation, and the 3-fold Massey product is the same as the triple Massey product defined above and is a secondary cohomology operation.

 described a further generalization called Matric Massey products,  which can be used to describe the differentials of the Eilenberg–Moore spectral sequence.

Applications

The complement of the Borromean rings gives an example where the triple Massey product is defined and non-zero. Note the cohomology of the complement can be computed using Alexander duality. If u, v, and w are 1-cochains dual to the 3 rings, then the product of any two is a multiple of the corresponding linking number and is therefore zero, while the Massey product of all three elements is non-zero, showing that the Borromean rings are linked. The algebra reflects the geometry: the rings are pairwise unlinked, corresponding to the pairwise (2-fold) products vanishing, but are overall linked, corresponding to the 3-fold product not vanishing.

More generally, n-component Brunnian links – links such that any -component sublink is unlinked, but the overall n-component link is non-trivially linked – correspond to n-fold Massey products, with the unlinking of the -component sublink corresponding to the vanishing of the -fold Massey products, and the overall n-component linking corresponding to the non-vanishing of the n-fold Massey product.

 used the Massey triple product to prove that the Whitehead product satisfies the Jacobi identity.

Massey products of higher order appear when computing twisted K-theory by means of the Atiyah–Hirzebruch spectral sequence (AHSS). In particular, if H is the twist 3-class,  showed that, rationally, the higher order differentials  in the AHSS acting on a class x are given by the Massey product of p copies of H with a single copy of x.

Here a formal manifold is one whose rational homotopy type can be deduced ("formally") from a finite-dimensional "minimal model" of its de Rham complex.  showed that compact Kähler manifolds are formal.

 use a Massey product to show that the homotopy type of the configuration space of two points in a lens space depends non-trivially on the simple homotopy type of the lens space.

See also
Toda bracket

References

External links 

 Massey products and its applications - contains many explicit examples
 Massey products in the Adams Spectral Sequence - contains references useful for understanding how to do these computations
 An Adams Spectral Sequence Primer - Bruner's notes
 Massey products and A-infinity structures

Algebraic topology
Differential topology
Ternary operations